J. L. van den Heuvel Orgelbouw is a firm of pipe organ builders, based in Dordrecht, Netherlands. The company specialises in the construction of instruments in the French Symphonic tradition.

History of the firm
Jan van den Heuvel had, from early childhood, felt an affinity with symphonic organ music. Jan founded his organ building company in 1967 at the age of twenty (this made him the youngest organ builder in the Netherlands), having spent four years in training with Flentrop in Zaandam, where he persisted in his championship of the romantic organ in the face of Dirk Andries Flentrop's neo-Baroque ideals.

Jan constructed his first organ (one manual and pedals, 10 stops) in 1967, attracting immediate critical acclaim for its voicing and high build standard. The actual construction took place in the workshop belonging to his father, a painter. He was commissioned to build a new three manual organ of 32 stops for the Singelkerk at Ridderkerk as a result of the many positive reactions to this first instrument - a significant milestone in the young organ-builder's career, as he was responsible not only for the design and construction of the instrument, but also for the richly carved organ case. The commissioning of this instrument necessitated the construction of a new workshop, which Jan himself designed. The instrument attracted widespread praise, leading to numerous orders for new organs and restoration of existing instruments. A new organ of two manuals and 33 stops was commissioned for the Lambertuskerk, Strijen, which was delivered in 1975, the year in which Jan's 17-year-old brother Peter joined the firm. Expansion of the business, with further enlargement of the workshops, was underpinned by receipt of a volume of new contracts for large organs. Particularly worthy of mention amongst these are the instruments in the Nieuwe Kerk, Katwijk aan Zee, l'Église Saint-Eustache, Paris (the largest organ in France), the Victoria Hall in Geneva and the Katarina kyrka in Stockholm (the last two buildings now restored after being gutted by fire) and the DR-BYEN Hall in Copenhagen.

Tonal ethos
Both Jan and Peter van den Heuvel were for a number of years interested in nineteenth century French organ building, as well as the traditions previously practiced in the Netherlands. Their contact with French organists such as Michelle Leclerc and Daniel Roth spurred them on to further studies on the Aristide Cavaillé-Coll organs. This led to numerous visits to France, not only to study and evaluate famous Cavaille-Coll organs (such as St. Sulpice, Notre-Dame and Sacré-Cœur in Paris). The brothers developed Cavaillé-Coll's own schemes to establish a style of organ that was entirely their own, but completely inspired by the French Symphonic tradition. This ethos continues to this day. However, not only does the firm specialise in French-style instruments, but they have also built organs in traditional Dutch style.

Notable organs

Notable players of van den Heuvel organs
Thomas Ospital
Ben van Oosten
Jean Guillou
Torvald Torén
Dirk Donker
David Lumsden

Photo gallery

References

External links
The official website of J. L. van den Heuvel Orgelbouw bv (English version)
The St-Eustache organ on Music and Musicians by Robert Poliquin, Université du Québec 
The PipeDreams Public Radio page for the St-Eustache organ, where numerous recordings can be heard.
 News in The Organ magazine of the new instrument being built for the DR-BYEN Hall in Copenhagen

Pipe organ building companies
Musical instrument manufacturing companies of the Netherlands
Companies based in South Holland
Dordrecht